"Please Don't Sympathise" is a song by Scottish singer Sheena Easton, recorded for her 1982 album, Madness, Money & Music. It was written by Steve Thompson and produced by Christopher Neil. In 1983, Canadian singer Celine Dion recorded the song in French, titled "Ne me plaignez pas". It was included on her album, Les chemins de ma maison and released as a single in 1984.

Celine Dion version

"Ne me plaignez pas"  is a song recorded by Canadian singer Celine Dion for her 1983 album, Les chemins de ma maison. It is a French-language adaptation of "Please Don't Sympathise", originally recorded by Sheena Easton in 1982. French words were written by Eddy Marnay and the song was produced by René Angélil. Dion also recorded an extended version of "Ne me plaignez pas", which appeared on her 1983 compilation, Du soleil au cœur.

On 2 April 1984, "Ne me plaignez pas" was released as the second single from Les chemins de ma maison in Quebec, Canada. On 14 April 1984, it entered the charts in Quebec, spending eight weeks on it and peaking at number eleven.

Track listings and formats
Canadian 7" single
"Ne me plaignez pas" – 3:00
"Vivre et donner" – 2:28

Charts

References

1982 songs
1983 songs
1984 singles
Celine Dion songs
French-language songs
Sheena Easton songs
Song recordings produced by Christopher Neil
Song recordings produced by Eddy Marnay
Songs written by Eddy Marnay